Beica de Jos is a commune in Mureș County, Transylvania, Romania. It is composed of six villages: Beica de Jos, Beica de Sus (Felsőbölkény), Căcuciu (Görgénykakucs), Nadășa (Görgénynádas), Sânmihai de Pădure (Szentmihály) and Șerbeni (Soropháza). 

The commune is located in the north-central part of the county, on the eastern edge of the Transylvanian Plateau, at the foot of the Gurghiu Mountains. The rivers Beica and Nadășa flow through the commune. Its neighbors are the city of Reghin and the communes Petelea, Gurghiu, Chiheru de Jos, Hodoșa, and Gornești.

See also
List of Hungarian exonyms (Mureș County)

References

Communes in Mureș County
Localities in Transylvania